White Paradise  (Czech: Bílý ráj) is a 1924 Czechoslovak film melodrama directed by Karel Lamač. The film was reconstructed in 2016.

Plot
Orphan girl Nina lives in the mountain region with her foster father innkeeper Rezek. She falls in love with an escaped prisoner Ivan Holar.

Cast
Karel Lamač as Ivan Holar
Vladimír Majer as Innkeeper Jakub Rezek
Anny Ondra as Orphan Nina Mirelová
Josef Rovenský as Puppeteer Tomáš
Saša Dobrovolná as Ivan's mother
Jan W. Speerger as Gendarme
Karel Schleichert as Gendarme
Karel Fiala as Prison director
Lo Marsánová as Yvetta Karenová
Přemysl Pražský as Prison guard
Mario Karas as Bailiff
Martin Frič as Doctor
Anna Lamačová-Karinská as Yvetta
Gustav Machatý as Yvetta's fiancée
Marie Veselá as Neighbour

References

External links
 

1924 films
Czechoslovak black-and-white films
Czech silent films
Films directed by Karel Lamač
1924 drama films